The Islamic Union of Hong Kong is an Islamic charitable and non-profit organisation in Hong Kong, China. The headquarters of the union is at the Ammar Mosque and Osman Ramju Sadick Islamic Centre.

History
The organisation was founded around 80 years ago by Muslims from South Asia and Maritime Southeast Asia who were in British Hong Kong to trade with the Republic of China. In 1980, the constitution of the organisation was revised to fulfill the requirements for incorporation as a legal entity under The Companies Ordinance of the British Hong Kong government.

Activities
The organisation regularly holds various types of classes, such as sewing, dawah, embroidery, handicraft, computer, English language, martial arts, Quran, Adhan etc. in several languages, such as English, Indonesian, Chinese and Filipino.

The organisation also runs a medical clinic, which includes a pharmacy served by volunteer Muslim doctors and nurses. The clinic also arranges body checks and health talks for members and non-members.

See also
 Islam in China
 Islam in Hong Kong
 Incorporated Trustees of the Islamic Community Fund of Hong Kong

References

External links
 

Indian diaspora in China
Islamic organisations based in Hong Kong
Pakistani diaspora in Asia